Urban Services Department was a government department in Hong Kong. It carried out the policies and managed the facilities of the former Urban Council. After being abolished with the Urban Council in 1999, its functions were inherited by the Food and Environmental Hygiene Department and the Leisure and Cultural Services Department.

See also
 Food and Environmental Hygiene Department
 Leisure and Cultural Services Department
 Regional Council, Hong Kong
 Regional Services Department
 Urban Council

External links
Food and Environmental Hygiene Department 
Leisure and Cultural Services Department

Hong Kong government departments and agencies
Politics of Hong Kong
History of Hong Kong